Kawasaki ZZR, sometimes stylized ZZ-R, refers to a series of motorcycles produced by Kawasaki Heavy Industries Motorcycle & Engine from 1990 to 2020.

zzr1100- 1052cc (1990-2001) 

zzr1200- 1164cc (2002-2005) 

zzr1400- 1352cc (2006-2011) 

zzr1400- 1441cc (2012-2020) 

Motorcycles in this series include:
 Kawasaki ZZ-R1400
 Kawasaki ZZ-R1200
 Kawasaki ZZ-R1100

 Kawasaki ZZR600
 Kawasaki ZZR400 
 Kawasaki Ninja 250R (ZZR-250)

See also 
 Kawasaki Ninja (ZX-R)
 Kawasaki GPZ series
 Kawasaki Z series
 List of Kawasaki motorcycles
 ZZR (disambiguation)